Lipmann is a surname. Notable people with the surname include:

Alexander Lipmann-Kessel (1914–1986), orthopaedic surgeon
Fritz Albert Lipmann (1899–1986), German-American biochemist
Yom-Tov Lipmann Heller (1578–1654), Bohemian rabbi
Yom-Tov Lipmann-Muhlhausen (fl. 1400), controversialist, Talmudist, kabalist and philosopher

See also
 Lippmann
 Lippman
 Liebmann

Jewish surnames